Tom-ic Energy is a 1965 Tom and Jerry short (though the year of copyright is 1964) directed and produced by Chuck Jones and the eighth in Jones' series.

Plot
Tom is chasing Jerry on top of a building and then through the building. During the chase two women, first an older woman then a younger woman, scream until the duo reach a balcony. Tom pokes his head through the other window and yells at Jerry, scaring the spirit out of Jerry's body. Jerry's spirit then squeals at Tom, causing him to pale and age rapidly.

Tom chases Jerry up work steps in a zigzag pattern and into the air until Jerry stops him and points to the ground, after which Tom falls through the piped balcony, splitting himself into pieces in mid-air. Jerry jumps down a water duct, and as Tom, seeing him, sticks his mouth out to swallow him, but misses, Jerry bursts through Tom. The duo are then forced to stop for a traffic light before the light turns yellow and both prepare to run, but that's when Tom dashes off too early and gets run over by a large red truck.

Tom pursues Jerry around a corner, but is forced by Jerry to stop and fall into a manhole. Jerry flees, but as Tom pops out of another manhole under Jerry, Jerry spins on the manhole cover, twisting Tom's head before Tom stops it with his finger. Jerry, still going around in circles on the manhole, goes on the edge and hits Tom's nose repeatedly, before accidentally dropping it after clutching his nose, flattening Tom's toes and making him feel the pain and screaming.

Jerry offers to inflate Tom's toes with a bike pump, but instead ends up over inflating Tom into a ball before letting go, then sends him rocketing into the air. Tom falls into a pair of Long Johns and is thrown back up to the top of the building, catching a feather boa and a lady's hat on the way back up. A love crazed male cat pursues Tom and kisses him while reciting French poetry as Jerry taunts him by playing a romantic piece on a pretend violin. Tom eventually becomes so irritated that he attacks the love crazed cat and flees. Jerry briefly changes the tune to the William Tell Overture before heading down to the street with Tom giving chase.

As Jerry is able to run under a bulldog walking down the street, Tom runs into the bulldog. Tom kisses the bulldog to flee and kicks him in the face. The furious bulldog chases after the cat, missing him several times trying to bite Tom. Annoyed, Jerry places a manhole cover between Tom and the bulldog, causing the bulldog to run into it and be shaped into a concertina before fleeing. The chase between Tom and Jerry then continues although Tom shakes Jerry's hand to thank him for taking care of the bulldog.

Crew
Story: Michael Maltese, Chuck Jones
Animation: Ken Harris, Don Towsley, Tom Ray, Dick Thompson, & Ben Washam
Backgrounds: Philip DeGuard
Vocal Effects: Mel Blanc, June Foray
In Charge of Production: Les Goldman
Co-Director and Layouts: Maurice Noble
Music: Eugene Poddany
Produced and Directed by Chuck Jones

Production notes
The title Tom-ic Energy is a pun on atomic energy. The term Tomics was also proposed by Frederick Soddy as the name for the branch of study now known as nuclear physics. The music score is primarily based on Niccolò Paganini's "Moto Perpetuo (Op. 11)".

External links

1965 films
1965 short films
1960s animated short films
Short films directed by Chuck Jones
Films directed by Maurice Noble
Films scored by Eugene Poddany
1965 animated films
Tom and Jerry short films
1960s American animated films
Metro-Goldwyn-Mayer short films
1965 comedy films
American comedy short films
Animated films without speech
Metro-Goldwyn-Mayer animated short films
MGM Animation/Visual Arts short films
Films with screenplays by Michael Maltese
1960s English-language films